Emilea Zingas (born April 22, 2002) is a Cypriot-American figure skater. Competing in ice dancing with her skating partner, Vadym Kolesnik, she is the 2022 CS Golden Spin of Zagreb bronze medalist and 2023 U.S. national pewter medalist.

Zingas previously represented Cyprus in women's singles, and was the 2020 Santa Claus Cup silver medalist and the 2021 Challenge Cup bronze medalist. She was the first Cypriot skater to qualify for the World Championships.

Personal life 
Zingas was born on April 22, 2002, in Grosse Pointe Farms, Michigan to parents Chris, an orthopedic surgeon, and Marsha, a dermatopathologist. She is the youngest of four children, including a sister, Elana, who currently plays ice hockey at Cornell University. Zingas' paternal grandparents, Nick and Xenia Zingas, were born in Cyprus. She holds both U.S. and Cypriot citizenship. 

Zingas graduated from Grosse Pointe South High School in 2020, and currently studies neuroscience at Wayne State University.

Career

Early career 
Zingas began skating as a preschooler and started training at age seven with Lindsay O'Donoghue and Brooke Castile O'Keefe in St. Clair Shores, Michigan. Competing for the United States early in her career, she won the 2018 U.S. national novice silver medal in her only trip to the U.S. Championships.

2020–2021 season 
During the 2020–21 season, Zingas took advantage of her gap semester and switched nationalities to compete for Cyprus. She made her international competitive debut at the 2020 CS Budapest Trophy, where she finished seventh. Zingas later competed at 2020 Ice Star and 2020 Santa Claus Cup, where she finished fifth and second, respectively. She noted that she was grateful to have the opportunity to travel internationally during the COVID-19 pandemic, especially as she was returning to her Michigan training base between events in Europe.

At the 2021 Challenge Cup in February, Zingas won the bronze behind Belgian Loena Hendrickx and Emmy Ma of Chinese Taipei, as well as earned her technical minimums to qualify for the 2021 World Championships. She is the first Cypriot skater to ever qualify for the World Championships. During the short program at the World Championships in March, Zingas popped a planned triple Lutz into a single, and fell on the triple flip in her planned triple flip-triple toe loop combination, both of which severely impacted her score. She finished thirty-sixth in the segment and did not advance to the free skate.

2021–2022 season 
After a tenth-place finish at the Skating Club of Boston's Cranberry Cup International event, Zingas was assigned to compete at the 2021 CS Nebelhorn Trophy to attempt to qualify a berth for Cyprus at the 2022 Winter Olympics. She placed ninth at the event, resulting in Cyprus being the second reserve for the Olympics. She appeared at two additional Challenger events in the fall, coming sixteenth at the 2021 CS Cup of Austria and fourteenth at the 2021 CS Warsaw Cup.

During her competitive season, Zingas was offered the opportunity to try out in ice dancing, a discipline she had no previous experience in, with reigning World Junior champion Vadym Kolesnik, whose partnership with Avonley Nguyen had ended after that gold medal win. Kolesnik would later say that "the first time I skated with Emilea I felt something special. I felt like I can be myself. She opens up in the way that I want to skate and that's how it comes out — freedom." On May 15, Zingas officially announced that the two would compete together representing the United States.

2022–2023 season 
Zingas/Kolesnik made their international debut at the 2022 CS Golden Spin of Zagreb, where they won the bronze medal.

After winning gold at the U.S. Ice Dance Final to qualify for the 2023 U.S. Championships, the team entered a dance field more open than normal due to presumptive national silver medalists Hawayek/Baker being absent due to health issues. Zingas/Kolesnik unexpectedly placed third in the rhythm dance, less than a point ahead of Zagreb gold medalists Carreira/Ponomarenko, who had erred on their twizzles. After the free dance, Carreira/Ponomarenko had squeaked ahead overall by 0.32, but Zingas/Kolesnik stood on the podium as pewter medalists, a noteworthy achievement in a team's first season. Zingas called the whole week "surreal."

Programs

With Kolesnik

As a single skater

Competitive highlights 
CS: Challenger Series

Ice dance

with Kolesnik for the United States

Women's singles

For Cyprus

For the United States

Detailed results 
ISU Personal best in bold.

Ice dance with Kolesnik

Women's singles

References

External links 
 
 
 

2002 births
Living people
American female single skaters
Cypriot female single skaters
American people of Greek Cypriot descent
People from Grosse Pointe Farms, Michigan
21st-century American women